Maciej Hen (born 13 June 1955 in Warsaw) is a Polish writer, translator and journalist.

Life
Maciej Hen is a son of a Polish writer Józef Hen and the late pedagogue and Russian teacher Irena Lebewal from Navariya near Lvov. Both of his parents are of Jewish origin. He attended (but in 1974 left just before the final examination) The National Art High School in Warsaw and in 1979 he completed his studies at the cinematography department of the National Film School in Łódź. On various occasions he worked as a camera operator, a director of photography and a director of documentary films, a still photographer and a photojournalist, a screenwriter, an actor, a journalist, a musician, an English translator and a TV lighting designer. As a journalist he published articles among others in the newspaper Gazeta Wyborcza.

Career 
In 2004, under the pen name Maciej Nawariak, he published his first novel According to Her. In 2015 his second historical novel, Solfatara, appeared and next year it was awarded The Witold Gombrowicz Literary Prize and the title of Book of the Year of the Warsaw Premiere of Literature, as well as shortlisted for Angelus Award. In 2019, Hen's third novel, Deutsch for Intermediates, was published by Wydawnictwo Literackie.

Awards
 2016 The title of Book of the Year of the Warsaw Premiere of Literature
 2016 The Witold Gombrowicz Literary Prize
 2016 shortlisted for The Angelus Award
 2016 shortlisted for The Norwid Award

Books 
 According to Her, Holland House Books, trans. by Anna Blasiak, 
(Polish edition Według niej. Warsaw: Wydawnictwo Due. 2004  . Under the pen name Maciej Nawariak)
 Solfatara. Warsaw: Wydawnictwo W.A.B. 2015 
 Deutsh dla średnio zaawansowanych (Deutsch for Intermediates). Krakow: Wydawnictwo Literackie. 2018 
 Beatlesi w Polsce (The Beatles in Poland). Warsaw: Wydawnictwo Agora 2021.

Filmography 
 1962: Jadą goście jadą [Guests are coming'] – actor
 1968: Dzieci z naszej szkoły – actor
 1984: Rozalka Olaboga – in part camera operator
 1986: Z nakazu serca i rozumu – director of photography
 1991: Pogranicze w ogniu – actor
 1998: Sprawa Martyniki – script
 2006: Fotografie Mojego taty – director, director of photography and music composer
 2008: Mata Hari znad Wisły – director, in part director of photography
 2013: Zdjęcie od Nasierowskiej, czyli życie wielokrotnie spełnione – in part director of photography
 2016: "Nie płacz kiedy odjadę" ‒ in part director of photography

References

External links 

1955 births
Living people
20th-century Polish novelists
Polish male novelists
Writers from Warsaw
21st-century Polish novelists